Cecilia Elena Rouse (born December18, 1963) is an American economist who has served as the 30th Chair of the Council of Economic Advisers since March 2021. She is the first Black American to hold this position. Prior to this, she served as the dean of the Princeton School of Public and International Affairs at Princeton University. Joe Biden nominated Rouse to be Chair of the Council of Economic Advisers in November 2020. 

Rouse was overwhelmingly confirmed by the Senate on March 2, 2021, by a vote of 95–4.

Early life and education 
Rouse grew up in Del Mar, California and graduated from Torrey Pines High School in 1981. She has two siblings: Forest Rouse, a physicist; and Carolyn Rouse, an anthropologist and professor at Princeton University. Her father Carl A. Rouse was a research physicist who received his Ph.D. from the California Institute of Technology in 1956. Her mother Lorraine worked as a school psychologist.

Rouse received a Bachelor of Arts in economics from Harvard University in 1986 and a PhD in economics from Harvard University in 1992.

Career
After earning her doctorate, Rouse joined the faculty at Princeton University in 1992.

Rouse served in the National Economic Council under President Bill Clinton from 1998 to 1999.

Rouse served as a member of President Barack Obama's Council of Economic Advisers from 2009 to 2011.

Rouse has served as the dean of the Princeton School of Public and International Affairs, and is the Lawrence and Shirley Katzman and Lewis and Anna Ernst Professor in the Economics of Education. She is the founding director of the Princeton University Education Research Section, is a member of the National Academy of Education and a research associate of the National Bureau of Economic Research. Her primary research interests are in labor economics with a focus on the economics of education. Rouse has served as an editor of the Journal of Labor Economics and as a senior editor of The Future of Children. She is a member of the board of directors of MDRC, and a director of the T. Rowe Price Equity Mutual Funds and an advisory board member of the T. Rowe Price Fixed Income Mutual Funds.

Biden administration
President Joe Biden nominated Rouse to become Chair of the Council of Economic Advisers. The Senate Banking Committee held hearings on her nomination on January 28, 2021. On February 4, 2021, the committee favorably reported Rouse's nomination to the Senate floor. The Senate confirmed Rouse by a vote of 95–4 on March 2, 2021.

In November 2022, it was announced that Rouse would be leaving her position as Chair of the Council of Economic Advisers following the 2022 midterms. In February 2023, Jared Bernstein was nominated as her successor by President Biden.

Personal life 
Rouse is married to Ford Morrison, the son of author Toni Morrison. They have two daughters.

Selected publications
 
  Abstract.

See also
 List of African-American United States Cabinet members
 List of female United States Cabinet members

References

External links 

Biography at Princeton University

|-

1963 births
Living people
21st-century American economists
21st-century African-American women
21st-century African-American people
Academics from California
African-American economists
African-American members of the Cabinet of the United States
American women economists
Biden administration cabinet members
Chairs of the United States Council of Economic Advisers
Clinton administration personnel
Economists from California
Harvard University alumni
Obama administration personnel
People from Del Mar, California
Princeton University faculty
Women members of the Cabinet of the United States